Nakhon Chai Si is a district (amphoe) of Nakhon Pathom province, central Thailand.

History
It was established in the reign of King Maha Chakkraphat of Ayutthaya kingdom. When King Chulalongkorn created the Monthon as part of the Thesaphiban administrative reform, Mueang Nakhon Chai Si was the capital city of Monthon Nakhon Chai Si. Later when the government gave up the system, Mueang Nakhon Chai Si was downgraded to be a district of Nakhon Pathom.

More than 1,000 years ago, Han Chinese called Nakhon Chai Si (including other districts in this region, such as Samut Sakhon) according Teochew dialect that  Lang-Ka-Su (pinyin: Lóng zǐ cuò), refers to 'home of dragon descendant'. Because the Tha Chin River flows through the winding like a serpent or dragon.

Geography
Neighboring districts are (from the north clockwise): Bang Len, Phutthamonthon, Sam Phran, Mueang Nakhon Pathom, and Don Tum.

The main water resource is the Tha Chin River, which is named Nakhon Chai Si River in the area of and around the district.

Economy
In mid-2019, the Department of Airports (DOA) proposed the construction of a new airport in Nakhon Pathom province, 50 kilometres west of Bangkok, to relieve pressure on Bangkok's two existing airports. The 20 billion baht airport would occupy 3,500 rai of land in Nakhon Chai Si District as well as Bang Len. Its capacity would be 25 million passengers annually. If approved, construction would start in 2023 and the airport would be operational by 2025 or 2026.

Administration
The district is divided into 24 sub-districts (tambons), which are further subdivided into 108 villages (mubans). Both Nakhon Chai Si and Huai Phlu have sub-district municipality (thesaban tambon) status. Each of the tambons has a tambon administrative organization (TAO).

References

External links
amphoe.com

Nakhon Chai Si